Wargaming Chicago-Baltimore (formerly Meyer/Glass Interactive, L.L.C., Day 1 Studios, LLC and Wargaming West Corporation) is an American game developer that operates in Chicago, Illinois and Hunt Valley, Maryland.

History 
They worked in tandem with developer FASA Interactive to create their first two games MechAssault, which Microsoft used to promote their Xbox Live service, and MechAssault 2: Lone Wolf. They worked with Monolith Productions to make the Xbox 360 and PlayStation 3 console ports of F.E.A.R..

In 2006, they signed a deal with LucasArts to develop the science fiction video game Fracture. It had mixed reviews by the gaming press. In 2010, Warner Bros. Interactive Entertainment announced that they would be developing the third installment in the F.E.A.R. franchise entitled F.E.A.R. 3, first announced using the title F.3.A.R., which was later confirmed as just for advertising.  When their subsequent project with Konami was canceled, however, around 100 employees (the vast majority of the team working on that project) were laid off.  The remaining team members moved forward with development on the free-to-play mech game Reign of Thunder.

On January 29, 2013, it was announced that Wargaming, the creator of World of Tanks, acquired Day 1 Studios for $20 million and rebranded it Wargaming West. The acquisition included the rights to Reign of Thunder, the status of which is currently under consideration.

Games developed 
As Meyer/Glass Interactive

As Day 1 Studios

As Wargaming Chicago-Baltimore

Canceled video games 
 Batman: Gotham by Gaslight
 TR2N: Liberation

References

External links 
Interview with company president Denny Thorley

Video game companies of the United States
Video game development companies
Companies based in Chicago
Companies based in Hunt Valley, Maryland
Video game companies established in 1997
American subsidiaries of foreign companies